The Honey bee mite may refer to:
Acarapis woodi, honey bee tracheal mite
Varroa destructor, bee mite that attacks honey bees Apis cerana and Apis mellifera

Animal common name disambiguation pages